Aleksandar Lukman (born April 29, 1967) is a Serbian professional basketball strength and conditioning and alpine skiing coach and former pole vaulter.

Early life and education
Lukman was born in Belgrade, SR Serbia, SFR Yugoslavia, where he finished an elementary and a high school. He earned his bachelor's degree in physical education from the University of Belgrade in 1991 and earned his doctor's degree from the Faculty of sport and tourism – TIMS in Novi Sad in 2008.

Coaching career in basketball
Lukman started his strength and conditioning coaching career in 1995. He was a strength and conditioning coach of Radnički Belgrade, Crvena zvezda and Hemofarm, as well as Russian teams Lokomotiv Kuban, UNICS and Khimki.

On July 15, 2018, Lukman was named a conditioning coach for Crvena zvezda. In June 2020, Crvena zvezda parted ways with him. In December 2020, he returned to the Zvezda for the rest of the 2020–21 season. In June 2022, he left Zvezda.

Career achievements and awards
Basketball career
 EuroCup Basketball champion: 1  (with Khimki: 2014–15)
 Adriatic League champion: 4  (with Hemofarm: 2004–05; with Crvena zvezda: 2018–19, 2020–21, 2021–22)
 Serbian League champion: 3  (with Crvena zvezda: 2018–19, 2020–21, 2021–22)
 Yugoslav League champion: 1  (with Crvena zvezda: 1997–98)
 Serbian Cup winner: 3  (with Crvena zvezda: 2012–13, 2020–21, 2021–22)
 Russian Cup winner: 1  (with UNICS: 2008–09)
 Adriatic Supercup winner: 1  (with Crvena zvezda: 2018)

References

External links
 Aleksandar Lukman Career at sportsacademy.edu.rs

1967 births
Living people
Alpine skiing coaches
KK Crvena zvezda assistant coaches
Serbian men's basketball coaches
Serbian male pole vaulters
Serbian expatriate basketball people in Russia
Serbian strength and conditioning coaches
Sportspeople from Belgrade
University of Belgrade Faculty of Sport and Physical Education alumni
Yugoslav male pole vaulters